The 1987 Virginia Slims Championships were the seventeenth WTA Tour Championships, the annual tennis tournament for the best female tennis players in singles on the 1987 WTA Tour. It was held from November 16 through November 23, 1987, in Madison Square Garden in New York City, United States. Steffi Graf won the singles title.

Champions

Singles

 Steffi Graf defeated  Gabriela Sabatini, 4–6, 6–4, 6–0, 6–4

Doubles

 Martina Navratilova /  Pam Shriver defeated  Claudia Kohde-Kilsch /  Helena Suková, 6–1, 6–1

References
 
 ITF tournament edition details

WTA Tour Championships
Virginia Slims Championships
Virginia Slims Championships
Virginia Slims Championships
1980s in Manhattan
Virginia Slims Championships
Madison Square Garden
Sports competitions in New York City
Sports in Manhattan
Tennis tournaments in New York City